Kabin is a town in Taninthayi Division, Myanmar.

References 

Populated places in Tanintharyi Region